Stone Cross Halt railway station served Stone Cross, in the district of Wealden, East Sussex, England from 1905 to 1935 on the East Coastway Line.

History 
The station opened on 11 September 1905 by the London Brighton and South Coast Railway. The halt was situated between Polegate and Hastings. The station closed on 7 July 1935. There was a petition raised by the Liberal Democrats to reopen the station as Langney station, but the campaign has been called off. 

However these plans look to have been revived and Eastbourne council leader David Tutt said, “One issue that I am pressing for as part of this work is the inclusion of a new station at Stone Cross. 

“This is not a new idea, indeed along with my colleague Alan Shuttleworth, we have been campaigning for this for decades as it would serve much of the eastern end of Eastbourne and help ease congestion of cars travelling to the town centre.”

References 

Disused railway stations in East Sussex
Wealden District
Former London, Brighton and South Coast Railway stations
Railway stations in Great Britain opened in 1905
Railway stations in Great Britain closed in 1935